Casarile is a comune (municipality) in the Province of Milan in the Italian region Lombardy, located about  southwest of Milan.

Casarile borders the following municipalities: Lacchiarella, Vernate, Binasco, Rognano, Giussago.

Demographic evolution

References

Cities and towns in Lombardy